Garry William Howe Jr. (born June 20, 1968) is a former American professional football player who was a defensive lineman in the National Football League (NFL) and the World League of American Football (WLAF). He played for the Pittsburgh Steelers, Cincinnati Bengals and Indianapolis Colts of the NFL, and the Frankfurt Galaxy and Amsterdam Admirals of the WLAF. He also played fullback for the Iowa Barnstormers as well as defensive lineman from 1995 to 2000. Howe played collegiately at Drake University and the University of Colorado.

References

1968 births
Living people
American football defensive tackles
Amsterdam Admirals players
Cincinnati Bengals players
Colorado Buffaloes football players
Drake Bulldogs football players
Frankfurt Galaxy players
Indianapolis Colts players
People from Spencer, Iowa
Pittsburgh Steelers players
Iowa Barnstormers players
Players of American football from Iowa